IIV may stand for:

 Inactivated influenza vaccine, an anti-influenza vaccine in inactivated form
 Invertebrate iridescent virus, vernacular for viruses in the subfamily Betairidovirinae